Charles Stone may refer to:

Sir Charles Stone (mayor) (1850–1931), mayor of Greenwich, England, 1915–1920
Charles Stone III (born 1966), American film director, son of Chuck Stone
Charles A. Stone (1867-1941), American electrical engineer and co-founder of Stone & Webster
Charles B. Stone III (1904–1992), United States Air Force general
Charles D. Stone (1920–1992), Pennsylvania politician
Charles Edwin Stone (1889–1952), English recipient of the Victoria Cross
Gordon Stone (rugby union) (Charles Gordon Stone, 1914–2015), Australian rugby union player
Charles Joel Stone (1936–2019), American statistician and mathematician
Charles P. Stone (1915–2012), American major general and commander of the 4th Infantry Division in the Vietnam War
Charles Pomeroy Stone (1824–1887), Union general during the American Civil War
Charles Warren Stone (1843–1912), United States Representative from and Lieutenant Governor of Pennsylvania
Charles Stone (English cricketer) (1865–1951), English cricketer
Charles Stone (New Zealand cricketer) (1866–1903), New Zealand cricketer
Charlie Stone, a fictional character in the TV series Veronica Mars
Chuck Stone (1924–2014), American journalist and Tuskegee Airman
Charlie Stone (rugby league) (1950–2018), English rugby league player
Charles Stone (priest) (died 1799), Anglican priest in Ireland